Ascanio della Corgna (1516 – 3 December 1571) was an Italian condottiere from Umbria. He rose to become Marchese di Castiglione del Lago, in part due to his family connections to a Pope.

Biography
Ascanio as a young man had followed his uncle to Rome, but his unbridled and violent temperament, disgusted his uncle, and he returned to Perugia. Ascanio was the brother of Cardinal Fulvio Giulio della Corgna, and both were nephews of Julius III, pope from 1550 to 1555.

Ascanio is described as having a peripatetic career as a professional soldier for hire, battling during his lifetime Lutherans in Germany and Turks in Malta. He began as a young man when he joined the French army with the siege of Mirandola as a squire for Gianfrancesco Gonzaga, il Cagnino. He later showed marked foolhardy bravery in the siege of Genoa in 1536, receiving wounds. He then participated in the siege of Casale Monferrato, where he was blinded in one eye. He allied himself with Piero Strozzi in his ill-fated rebellion against the Medici in Florence. He was victorious in a famous personal duel outside of Bologna.

He was then recruited by the infantry-deficient Republic of Venice to battle the rebel Ariadeno Barbarossa and assault Castelnuovo di Cattaro. He then returned to Perugia where he led a series of near-rebellions of Umbrian communes against the rule of Pope Paul III, which reached some reconciliation around 1540. In 1563, he was made Marchese by Pope Pius IV, but later jailed for conspiring with foreign powers. These powers, led by García Álvarez de Toledo, however lobbied for his freedom and he was released to participate in the battles against the Turks in the Great Siege of Malta and provided substantial leadership in the Lepanto. He died in Rome and was conducted to a hero's funeral in Umbria.

Ascanio had commissioned the Palazzo della Corgna built at Castiglione del Lago. Ascanio had no direct heirs, and his title and property passed on to his nephew, Diomede della Corgna. Both Ascanio and his heirs frescoed the interiors with mythologic and historic scenes, some depicting the feats of Ascanio.

His offspring did not match his stature, and they were deposed from their estates in the mid-17th-century.

References

1516 births
1571 deaths
People from Perugia
16th-century condottieri